Ilídio Coelho (born 23 July 1960) is an Angolan sprinter. He competed in the men's 100 metres at the 1980 Summer Olympics at the age of 19. He was entered to race in heat 4 and finished 7th out of 8 sprinters with a time of 11.42 seconds, 0.13 seconds faster than last place finisher Besha Tuffa of Ethiopia.

References

External links
 

1960 births
Living people
Athletes (track and field) at the 1980 Summer Olympics
Angolan male sprinters
Olympic athletes of Angola
Sportspeople from Luanda